Parasiccia shirakii is a moth of the subfamily Arctiinae. It was described by Shōnen Matsumura in 1930. It is found in Taiwan.

References

Lithosiini
Moths described in 1930